Wisdom Chibuike Onyekwere is a Nigerian former footballer. He is last known to have been attached to Național București of the Romanian Liga I in the 2003–2004 season.

Singapore

Playing for Baletsier Khalsa of the Singapore S.League in 2002, Onyekwere formed a striker partnership with fellow Nigerian Itimi Wilson for the 2003 season; however, he and Itimi were sacked from the club by June that year, with him enjoining the Football Association of Singapore's Player Status Committee over three months' salary.

References

External links
 

1981 births
Living people
Nigerian footballers
Nigerian expatriate footballers
Singapore Premier League players
Expatriate footballers in Singapore
Association football forwards
Balestier Khalsa FC players
FC Progresul București players
Liga I players
Nigerian expatriate sportspeople in Romania
Expatriate footballers in Romania